Koonimedu is a panchayat village in Tamil Nadu, India. It has a population of approximately 5000 people, of whom 50% are Muslims and the remaining 50% predominantly non Muslims.Koonimedu is also known as chinna Kuwait because of their occupational route. One after another, koonimedu people travelleing Kuwait to earn. Apart from Kuwait, some other countries where Koonimedu NRIs living is Singapore, Malaysia, UAE, Oman, Qatar, France and Saudi Arabia. 
Koonimedu village was one of the oldest villages in Villupuram. It is said that, Muslim population spread here during period King Arcod Nawab, for his soldiers passing way to Pondicherry old French colony. The latitude 12.11574 and longitude 79.907041 are the geocoordinate of the Koonimedu. Chennai is the state capital for Koonimedu village. The other nearest state capital from Koonimedu is Pondicherry and its distance is 21.3 km The other surrounding state capitals are Pondicherry 21.3 km, Bangalore 271.3 km, Thiruvananthapuram 

The surrounding nearby villages and its distance from Koonimedu are Anumandai 5.9 km, Marakkanam 10.5 km, Siruvadi 12.5 km, Endiyur 23.2 km, Molasur 24.1 km, Annamputhur 26.0 km, etc.

The official language of Koonimedu
The native language of Koonimedu is Tamil and more than 25 percent of koonimedu people communicates in Urdu. As majority living here is Urdu Muslims.

Koonimedu Sun rise time
Koonimedu village is located in the UTC 5.30 time zone and it follows Indian standard time(IST). Koonimedu sun rise time varies 10 minutes from IST. The vehicle driving side in Koonimedu is left, all vehicles should take left side during driving. Koonimedu people are using its national currency which is Indian Rupee and its international currency code is INR. Koonimedu phones and mobiles can be accessed by adding the Indian country dialing code +91 from abroad. Koonimedu people are following the dd/mm/yyyy date format in day-to-day life.

The nearest railway stations in and around Koonimedu
The nearest railway station to Koonimedu is Puducherry which is located in and around 22.9 kilometres' distance. The following table shows other railway stations and its distance from koonimedu.
Puducherry railway station	22.9 km
Villianur railway station	27.1 km
Olakur railway station	        29.2 km
Tindivanam railway station	30.5 km
Mailam railway station	        30.6 km

Nearest airport to Koonimedu
Koonimedu's nearest airport is Pondicherry Airport situated at 16.0 km distance. Few more airports around Koonimedu are as follows.
Pondicherry Airport	        16.0 km
Tambaram Air Force Station	90.6 km
Chennai International Airport	101.8 km

The nearest banks and atm in and around Koonimedu
State Bank Of India Koonimedu .
Indian Overseas Bank Koonimedu.
SBI ATM Koonimedu.
IOB Atm Koonimedu.
SBI Atm Anumandai.

Nearest districts to Koonimedu
The other nearest district headquarters is puducherry situated at 21.8 km distance from Koonimedu. Surrounding districts from Koonimedu are as follows.
Puducherry  district	21.8 km
Cuddalore district	44.4 km
Viluppuram  district	49.0 km
Kanchipuram  district	84.4 km
Tiruvannamalai district	91.1 km

Nearest town/city to Koonimedu
Koonimedu's nearest town/city/important place is Marakkanam located at the distance of 10.5 kilometres. Surrounding town/city/TP/CT from Koonimedu are as follows:
Marakkanam	10.5 km
Kalapet         5.0 km
Pondicherry	21.3 km
Villupuram	49.0 km
Auroville       15.0 km

Schools in and around Koonimedu
Koonimedu nearest schools has been listed as follows.
Government hr sec school   0 km
AL Rasheed matric high school 0 km
Alm metric  hr sec school  0 km
Puc school 0 km
The Study school    5 km
Kolping matri hr sec school  5 km
Kazhikkuppam School 	6.6 km
Ragavendra School  Auroville Via	16.0 km
Kottakuppam High School With Play Ground	19.0 km
Kottakuppam High School	19.1 km
Government hr.sec.school anumandai.3 km

Beaches in and around Koonimedu
Koonimedu's nearest beach is Pondicherry Beach located at the distance of 12.4 kilometers. Surrounding beaches from Koonimedu are as follows.

White Beach  00 km
Pondicherry Beach	12.4 km
Silver Beach	        43.9 km
Mahabalipuram Beach	63.5 km
Parankipatai Beach	71.4 km
Golden Beach	        96.3 km

Koonimedu map
Google map

References

Villages in Viluppuram district
https://viluppuram.nic.in/